Dieunomia nevadensis, the Nevada nomia, is a species of sweat bee in the family Halictidae. It is found in Central America and North America.

Subspecies
These five subspecies belong to the species Dieunomia nevadensis:
 Dieunomia nevadensis angelesia (Cockerell, 1910)
 Dieunomia nevadensis arizonensis (Cockerell, 1899)
 Dieunomia nevadensis bakeri (Cockerell, 1898)
 Dieunomia nevadensis nevadensis (Cresson, 1874)
 Dieunomia nevadensis stellata (Cross, 1958)

References

Further reading

External links

 

Halictidae
Articles created by Qbugbot
Insects described in 1874